Livermore loops (also known as the Livermore Fortran kernels or LFK) is a benchmark for parallel computers. It was created by Francis H. McMahon from scientific source code run on computers at Lawrence Livermore National Laboratory. It consists of 24 do loops, some of which can be vectorized, and some of which cannot. 

The benchmark was published in 1986 in Livermore fortran kernels: A computer test of numerical performance range.

The Livermore loops were originally written in Fortran, but have since been ported to many programming languages. 

Each loop carries out a different mathematical kernel
.
Those kernels 
are:
 hydrodynamics fragment
 incomplete Cholesky conjugate gradient
 inner product
 banded linear systems solution
 tridiagonal linear systems solution
 general linear recurrence equations
 equation of state fragment
 alternating direction implicit integration
 integrate predictors
 difference predictors
 first sum
 first difference
 2-D particle in a cell
 1-D particle in a cell
 casual Fortran
 Monte Carlo search
 implicit conditional computation
 2-D explicit hydrodynamics fragment
 general linear recurrence equations
 discrete ordinates transport
 matrix-matrix transport
 Planckian distribution
 2-D implicit hydrodynamics fragment
 location of a first array minimum.

References

External links
 Livermore Loops, Fortran version
 Livermore Loops, C version

Parallel computing
Supercomputer benchmarks